Danny-Boy Hatchard (born 26 July 1991) is an English actor, known for portraying the role of Lee Carter in the BBC soap opera EastEnders. Hatchard's other credits include Aaron in the 2014 film We Still Kill the Old Way and Steven Pierce in the 20th anniversary production of Beautiful Thing. In July 2019, it was announced that he will play Private Rhett Charlton in the fourth series of Our Girl.

Career
On 21 January 2014, Hatchard was cast in the role of Lee Carter in the BBC soap opera EastEnders. He began filming his first scenes in February. It was announced in 2016 that Hatchard would leave EastEnders in 2017. He returned temporarily in late 2019 for a short stint, and again in December 2020. In 2020 Hatchard joined the cast of the BBC military drama Our Girl as Private Rhett Charlton, whilst he appeared as Lee in 2021's Ridley Road.

References

External links 
 

1991 births
Living people
English male soap opera actors
21st-century English male actors